The  La Crosse Spartans season was the team's second season as a professional indoor football franchise and second in the Indoor Football League (IFL). One of twenty-two teams competing in the IFL for the 2011 season, the La Crosse, Wisconsin-based La Crosse Spartans were members of the Great Lakes Division of the United Conference.

Under the leadership of owner Chris Kokalis, and head coach Kyle Moore-Brown, the team played their home games at the La Crosse Center in La Crosse, Wisconsin.

The season began February 19, 2011, in the IFL’s showcase game, the Kickoff Classic. La Crosse played seven regular season games at home over the course of February through early June.  Indoor football veteran Jose Jefferson joined the Spartans for the 2011 season as their Offensive Coordinator.  

After four games of the 2011 season it was announced that head coach Gilbert Brown would be taking a leave of absence from the team for personal reasons, and that his brother Kyle Moore-Brown would be switching from assistant coach to head coach of the Spartans.

On April 30, 2011, the Spartans became one of the few teams in indoor football history to post a shutout, beating the Lehigh Valley Steelhawks 51-0.

On August 30, 2011, GM and co-owner Chris Kokalis announced the formation of the Cedar Rapids Titans, including former Spartans members Xzavie Jackson, Travis Miller and Mike Polaski.  The Titans were listed as members of the Great Lakes division, along with the Green Bay Blizzard, Bloomington Extreme and Chicago Slaughter, but the Spartans were not listed in this division they were previously in.  Kokalis said the Spartans franchise will "cease to exist", but also said that the team was up for sale.

Schedule
Key:

Preseason

Regular season

* = Kickoff Classic Game, before week 1 starts.

Roster

Standings

References

La Crosse Spartans
La Crosse Spartans seasons
La Crosse Spartans